Glenora, also known historically as the Hudson's Bay Company's Fort Glenora and during the Cassiar Gold Rush as Glenora Landing, was an unincorporated settlement in the Stikine Country of northwestern British Columbia, Canada. It was located on the banks of the Stikine River, just southwest and approximately 13 miles downstream from the community of Telegraph Creek. A customs office existed 1901–1903.

Name origin
Helen B. Akrigg and G.P.V. Akrigg in their British Columbia Place Names ascribe the origin of the name to a combination of the Gaelic glenn for "valley" with the Spanish ora for gold.

See also
Grand Canyon of the Stikine
SS Fort Glenora

References

Hudson's Bay Company forts
Unincorporated settlements in British Columbia
Stikine Country
Hudson's Bay Company trading posts
Populated places on the Stikine River